The Anglican Diocese of Zonkwa is one of 13 within the Anglican Province of Abuja, itself one of 14 provinces within the Church of Nigeria. The inaugural bishop was Duke Akamisoko; and the current bishop is Jacob Kwashi

Notes

Church of Nigeria dioceses
Dioceses of the Province of Abuja